Lone Pine State Park is a public recreation area on the southwest side of Kalispell, Montana, United States. The day-use state park's  include  of trails for hiking, mountain biking, snowshoeing, and horseback riding.

History
The park's original 162 acres were donated to the state in 1941 by Ernest and Hazel White. The Whites stipulated that the land be developed for public use and to teach an appreciation for the benefits of conservation.

References

External links 
Lone Pine State Park Montana Fish, Wildlife & Parks
Lone Pine State Park Trail Map Montana Fish, Wildlife & Parks

State parks of Montana
Protected areas of Flathead County, Montana
Protected areas established in 1941
1941 establishments in Montana